Me Before You is a 2016 romantic drama film directed by Thea Sharrock in her directorial debut and adapted by author Jojo Moyes from her 2012 novel of the same name. The film stars Emilia Clarke, Sam Claflin, Janet McTeer, Charles Dance, and Brendan Coyle.

The film was shot in various historic locations across the UK, including Pembroke Castle in Wales and Chenies Manor House in Buckinghamshire, England. Released on 3 June 2016 in the United Kingdom and North America, the film received mixed reviews and grossed $208 million worldwide.

Plot
William "Will" Traynor was a once successful banker and active sportsman. However his life is changed when he is accidentally hit by a motorcycle while walking to work.

Years later, Louisa "Lou" Clark is hired as caregiver for Will, now tetraplegic as a result of the accident. Will's mother hopes Lou's bubbly personality will help lift Will's depressed and cynical spirits, but Will is initially cold towards Lou. Will's ex-girlfriend Alicia visits and reveals that she is to marry Will's former best friend, Rupert. Lou perseveres with Will and they begin to grow closer during their time together. She learns he is cultured and worldly, in contrast to her simple life spent with her parents or boyfriend, Patrick.

Overhearing an argument between Will's parents, Lou learns that Will has conceded six months to them before he will visit Dignitas in Switzerland for assisted suicide, as he is unable to accept a disabled life, which is quite different from the active, vivacious lifestyle he lived before the accident. Lou takes it upon herself to change his mind by organizing trips and adventures in an effort to show him that life is still worth living. Meanwhile, Patrick's jealousy regarding the time that Lou spends with Will increases until he and Lou split up.

Will asks Lou to accompany him to Alicia's wedding, where they start to fall in love. During a luxurious trip to Mauritius, Will tells Lou he still intends to take assisted suicide, saying he wants her to live a full independent life, instead of half a life with him. Heartbroken, Lou quits as Will's caregiver and refuses contact with him.

Lou’s father visits Lou and convinces her to talk with Will, but she finds out he has already left for Switzerland. She follows him there to be with him in his final moments.

Some weeks after Will's death Lou reads a letter he left for her while sitting in his favorite café in Paris. In it, he says he has left her enough money to follow her dreams and encourages her to live her life abundantly.

Cast
 Emilia Clarke as Louisa "Lou" Clark
 Sam Claflin as William "Will" Traynor
 Janet McTeer as Camilla Traynor
 Charles Dance as Steven Traynor
 Brendan Coyle as Bernard Clark
 Steve Peacocke as Nathan
 Matthew Lewis as Patrick
 Jenna Coleman as Katrina "Treena" Clark
 Samantha Spiro as Josie Clark
 Alan Breck as Grandad
 Vanessa Kirby as Alicia Dawares
 Joanna Lumley as Mary Rawlinson
 Ben Lloyd-Hughes as Rupert Collins
 Diane Morgan as Sharon
 Chris Wilson as Major Timothy Dawares

Production

Development 
On 2 April 2014, it was announced Thea Sharrock would direct the film. Before casting Emilia Clarke knew she wanted to audition for this role as she said "That's just kind of an interesting concoction I hadn't read before".  On 2 September 2014, Emilia Clarke and Sam Claflin were cast in the film. Stephen Peacocke was cast on 24 March 2015, with Jenna Coleman and Charles Dance cast on 2 April 2015. On 9 April 2015, Janet McTeer joined the cast; Brendan Coyle, Matthew Lewis, Samantha Spiro, Vanessa Kirby and Ben Lloyd-Hughes joined the cast the next day. Sam Claflin thoughts after filming were "This was probably the most physically challenging thing that I’ve ever done,”

Filming

Principal photography began in 29 April 2015 and ended on 26 June 2015. The film was shot in various locations in the United Kingdom, including Pembroke Castle in Pembroke, Wales (the Traynors' estate); Wytham Abbey in Oxfordshire, England (the Traynors' home within the castle walls); Sandown Park in Esher, Surrey, England (horse race and airport check-in scenes); Harrow, London (Lou's family home); and Chenies Manor House in Chenies, Buckinghamshire, England (wedding scenes), while Mallorca, Spain, stands in for Mauritius.

Costume 
Jill Taylor, the costume designer, thought Lou would have more of a 'quirky' wardrobe based of the book "she has these ‘leprechaun’ shoes, so we had to find some quirky shoes. By accident, we were in a shop and found these amazing shoes by Irregular Choice, and I just thought, ‘Oh, my God, that's Lou!’ They suddenly became the basis of her wardrobe of shoes.”. Will's character clothing was more based on his before accident life as he wore luxurious suits.

Music

Release
In July 2014, it was announced that the film would be released on 21 August 2015. In May 2015, the film's release date was moved to 3 June 2016. In November 2015, the film's release date was brought forward, to 4 March 2016, before being delayed again in January 2016, to its previous 3 June 2016 release date.

Reception

Box office
Me Before You grossed $56.2 million in North America and over $152 million in other territories for a total of $208.3 million, against a budget of $20 million.

In North America, Me Before You opened on 3 June 2016 alongside Popstar: Never Stop Never Stopping and Teenage Mutant Ninja Turtles: Out of the Shadows and was expected to gross around $15 million from 2,704 theaters in its opening weekend. The film grossed $1.4 million from its Thursday night previews and $7.8 million on its first day. In its opening weekend the film grossed $18.3 million, finishing third at the box office behind Teenage Mutant Ninja Turtles: Out of the Shadows ($35.3 million) and X-Men: Apocalypse ($22.3 million).

Critical response
On Rotten Tomatoes, the film has an approval rating of 54% based on reviews from 180 critics, and an average rating of 5.5/10. The site's critical consensus reads, "Me Before You benefits from Emilia Clarke and Sam Claflin's alluring chemistry, although it isn't enough to compensate for its clumsy treatment of a sensitive subject." On Metacritic the film has a score of 51 out of 100 based on 36 critics, indicating "mixed or average reviews". Audiences polled by CinemaScore gave the film an average grade of "A" on an A+ to F scale.

Chris Nashawaty of Entertainment Weekly gave it a grade of B+ and wrote: "It may not quite rise to the level of a classic three-hankie tearjerker, but it's proof that sometimes one or two hankies is more than enough to get the job done."

Accolades

Controversy and protests
The film sparked criticism from many in the disability rights movement, who perceive an underlying message that people with disabilities are a burden on their families and carers, and claim the film promotes the view that people are better off dead than disabled. They view the film as advocating suicide so that their loved ones can "live boldly". Others found the film exploitative of the disability community by stirring the emotions of viewers without actually aiding disabled people by accurate representation or employment in acting roles, while pointing out the casting of non-disabled actors as disabled characters. The #MeBeforeEuthanasia backlash was led by celebrities with disabilities including Liz Carr, Penny Pepper, Mik Scarlet, and Cherylee Houston in the United Kingdom, and Dominick Evans and Emily Ladau  in the United States, as well as activists from Not Dead Yet in both countries. Protests in the United States occurred in cities including Los Angeles, New York City, Boston, Hartford, Denver, Atlanta, Chicago, Baltimore and Philadelphia. There were also protests in Australia.

In response to the backlash, author Jojo Moyes said the story was inspired by her own family where relatives required 24-hour care, as well as a real-life news story about a quadriplegic man who convinced his parents to take him to a centre for assisted suicide. About Traynor's decision she said: "The fact is, in the film as in the book, nobody else agrees with what he decides to do. This is not by any means sending out a message. It's just about one character – it's nothing more than that."

See also
 Disability in the arts

References

External links
 
 

2016 films
2016 directorial debut films
2016 romantic drama films
American romantic drama films
British romantic drama films
Films about euthanasia
Films about paraplegics or quadriplegics
Films based on British novels
Films based on romance novels
Film controversies
Films produced by Karen Rosenfelt
Films scored by Craig Armstrong (composer)
Films set in England
Films set in London
Films set in Mauritius
Films set in Paris
Films set in Switzerland
Films shot in Buckinghamshire
Films shot in London
Films shot in Mallorca
Films shot in Oxfordshire
Films shot in Pembrokeshire
Films shot in Surrey
Films with screenplays by Scott Neustadter and Michael H. Weber
Metro-Goldwyn-Mayer films
New Line Cinema films
2010s English-language films
2010s American films
2010s British films
Films about disability